Stelios Chasiotis (born 11 May 1972) is a retired Greek football defender.

References

1972 births
Living people
Greek footballers
Apollon Larissa F.C. players
Edessaikos F.C. players
Panionios F.C. players
Ethnikos Asteras F.C. players
Super League Greece players
Association football defenders